Ben Draper may refer to:

Ben Draper (actor) in CB the Red Caboose
Ben Draper, character in Zombie Chronicles